Islington station is an MBTA Commuter Rail station in Westwood, Massachusetts. Located in the Islington neighborhood, it serves the Franklin Line.  It was formerly the junction between the Norfolk County Railroad's original main line to Dedham (later abandoned) and the Midland Railroad's line to Boston via Readville station. Islington station has low-level platforms and is not accessible.

References

External links

MBTA - Islington

MBTA Commuter Rail stations in Norfolk County, Massachusetts
Stations along New York and New England Railroad lines